The Clay Baronetcy, of Fulwell Lodge in the County of Middlesex, is a title in the Baronetage of the United Kingdom. It was created in 1841 for William Clay, Member of Parliament for Tower Hamlets from 1832 to 1857 and Secretary to the Board of Control from 1839 to 1841. He was the son of George Clay, a prominent London merchant and shipowner.

Clay Baronets, of Fulwell Lodge (1841)
Sir William Clay, 1st Baronet (1791–1869)
Sir William Dickason Clay, 2nd Baronet (1828–1876)
Sir George Clay, 3rd Baronet (1831–1878)
Sir Arthur Temple Felix Clay, 4th Baronet (1842–1928)
Sir George Felix Neville Clay, 5th Baronet (1871–1941)
Sir Henry Felix Clay, 6th Baronet (8 February 1909 – 8 June 1985)
Sir Richard Henry Clay, 7th Baronet (2 June 1940 – 28 November 2020), married 1963, Alison Mary, only daughter of Dr J. Gordon Fife: three sons, two daughters.
Sir Charles Richard Clay, 8th Baronet (born 1965), educated at the University of East Anglia. He married Janette Maria Carothers in May 2000 and has two children: William Charles Clay (born 13 October 2004) and Rachel Elizabeth Clay (born 7 March 2008).

Notes

References
Kidd, Charles, Williamson, David (editors). Debrett's Peerage and Baronetage (1990 edition). New York: St Martin's Press, 1990, 

The Leeds Mercury (Leeds, England), Saturday, 6 July 1878; Issue 12555.

Clay